Oil Nut Bay is a coral reef bay situated on the northeast coast of Virgin Gorda in the British Virgin Islands, about  west of Pajaros Point.

Location
Oil Nut Bay is a coral reef bay, which is described as "headland attached linear reef".
The coastline extends  to Leverick Bay, along a stretch which is characterised by its mangroves.
During an excursion in the 1970s, roughly 160 trees and large shrubs were identified in the area, including Eugenia sessiliflora.

Commercial development
A resort community, intended for the wealthy with multi-million dollar villas, is developing at Oil Nut Bay, led by American developer David Johnson and his company, Victor International. The firm was given the planning permission to build 400 villas, but decided on building 88 of them, set in 300 acres. 
A May 2016 article by Caribbean Journal announced that the resort is still expanding, focusing on the development of four to six bedroom villas. The development is being built with underground utilities and is powered by solar energy. The resort has a double helipad and luxury tennis courts.

The clubhouse was inaugurated in January 2012. The Oil Nut Bay and the YCCS development  had together employed over 200 people.

Threats
The major project at Oil Nut Bay is decreasing the amount of dry tropical forest and increasing traffic of people and materials within and between the islands and other locations, creating a threat to the local herpetofauna.
Oil Nut Bay is particularly vulnerable to anchor damage due to its scenic appeal.

References

Sources

External links
 Multimedia All About Oil Nut Bay

Geography of the British Virgin Islands
Populated places in the British Virgin Islands
Virgin Gorda